Etha may refer to:

 Saint Etha, an alternate name of the 5th-century Cornish Saint Tetha
 Etna, Nebraska, formerly known as "Etha"
 Etha (wasp), a genus of wasps

ETHA may refer to:
 Altenstadt Air Base (ICAO code ETHA)

Etha may refer to: Ethan